The Victorian Reliance II is a cargo ship owned by Toll Shipping in Australia. It is primarily used on Bass Strait services between Melbourne and Burnie. It replaced the Victorian Reliance.

Along with its sister ship Tasmanian Achiever II, it was the largest cargo ship registered in Australia when introduced in March 2019.

References

External links

Container ships
Ro-ro ships
Ships built in Nanjing
Toll Group
2018 ships